Perfume Tree was a band from Vancouver, British Columbia that existed from 1991 until December 1999.  Members were Jane Tilley, Bruce Turpin and Peter Lutwyche The band performed mostly psychedelic electronic rock.

History
Perfume Tree was formed by a group of disc jockeys from the University of British Columbia's campus radio station, CITR. The group signed with Zulu Records, and released an album, Dust, in 1992.

After releasing three more albums with Zulu, the band signed with World Domination Records, and released an EP, Fathom the Sky in 1995.

The band continued performing in the Vancouver area.  Their 1998 album Feeler blended Tilley's vocals with electronic rock rhythms.

Four of their songs were chosen for the 2000 Canadian crime drama The Spreading Ground directed by Derek Vanlint.  Virgin, Dreaming, and Paradise were used in part, and So Far Away appeared almost in its entirety at the end of the film.

The song Uneasy, from the album A Lifetime Away, appeared on the soundtrack to the 2007 film Weirdsville.

A few of their songs were used in the Teton Gravity Research skiing films.

The samples "Don't you believe in anything?" and "The future's not so bad, have faith in me" from the song Aircraft Engines on The Sun's Running Out are Ace from the Doctor Who episode The Curse of Fenric when she speaks to the Vicar in the empty church.

Perfume Tree's last album, Felt, was released in 2000. Tilley and Lutwyche went on to form Veloce with Ian MacLachlan.

Discography
 Dust - Zulu Records, 1992
 Remote (Extended Play) - Zulu Records, 1993
 The Sun's Running Out - Zulu Records, 1994
 A Lifetime Away - Zulu Records, 1995
 Fathom the Sky (Extended Play) - World Domination Records, 1995
 Tides Out - World Domination Records, 1997
 Feeler - World Domination Records, 1998
 Felt - World Domination Records, 2000

References

External links
 Perfume Tree
 myspace/Perfume Tree
 minimum records

Canadian electronic music groups
Musical groups from Vancouver
Musical groups established in 1991
Musical groups disestablished in 1999
1991 establishments in British Columbia
1999 disestablishments in British Columbia
Psychedelic musical groups